Mina Orfanou (born 3 May 1982 in Rhodes) is a Greek actress. She grew up in Kalymnos. She is notable for her lead role in Strella, for which she received the Best Actress award at the 2010 Hellenic Film Academy Awards. She is a transgender woman.

References

External links 
 
 iShow.gr

Living people
1982 births
Greek actresses
People from Rhodes
Transgender actresses
People from Kalymnos